Lootere (Translation: Robbers) is a 1993 Bollywood action movie, written and directed by Dharmesh Darshan and produced by Suneel Darshan. The film featured Sunny Deol and Juhi Chawla, along with Naseeruddin Shah, Anupam Kher and Chunky Pandey in supporting roles. The film was one of the highest-grossing films of the year.

Plot
The movie opens with the apparent death of Anjali (Juhi Chawla) movie is a love story of Karan (Sunny Deol) and Anjali (Juhi Chawla). Karan, a decorated police officer is given the duty to protect Anjali, who is the only witness against one of the underworld bosses known as Chengez Lala. In order to safeguard Anjali, Karan has to take her far away in the wilderness so that no one gets to know where she is. During this escapade, Karan and Anjali fall in love and desire to get married against all odds. How the hero fights all the villains and saves his girl forms the crux of the story.

Cast
Naseeruddin Shah as Sikandar
Sunny Deol as Karan
Juhi Chawla as Anjali
Chunky Pandey as Ali
Anupam Kher as Chengez Lala
Pooja Bedi as Devyani
Sharat Saxena as Lala's henchman
Anang Desai as Inspector Rane
Mahesh Anand as Deadly Henchman
Dinesh Anand as Lala's henchman
Jack Gaud as Lala's Henchman
Mushtaq Khan as Joshi
Subbiraj as Police Commissioner
Ajit Vachani
Dan Dhanoa

Soundtrack
Actor Manoj Kumar penned a song in the film along with lyricist Majrooh Sultanpuri. Director Dharmesh Darshan also penned the song "Main Teri Rani".
The music was a big hit when released. Lata Mangeshkar sang 2 songs, a duet each with Manhar Udhas and Suresh Wadkar. Despite the success of the music of this film, Dharmesh Darshan never repeated Anand–Milind for any of his future projects. Original background music from Viju Shah. Multiple playback singers contributed their voice, includes Lata Mangeshkar, Asha Bhosle, Suresh Wadkar, Mohammed Aziz, Manhar Udhas, Pankaj Udhas, Kumar Sanu, Alka Yagnik, Sukhwinder Singh, Anupama Deshpande & Sapna Mukherjee
The songs featured in the top 10 albums of the year.

References

External links
 

1993 films
1990s Hindi-language films
Indian action films
Films scored by Anand–Milind
1993 directorial debut films
Films directed by Dharmesh Darshan
1993 action films